This article details the fixtures and results of the Laos national football team.

Results

External links
Laos » Fixtures & Results at worldfootball.net

References

Results